Paris Métro Line 5 is one of the 16 Metro lines built in Paris, France.  It crosses the east of Paris from Bobigny – Pablo Picasso to Place d'Italie. It is the eighth-busiest line on the network.

History
On 15 June 2011 the MF 01 began entering revenue service onto Line 5, gradually replacing the aging MF 67 stock. The initial announcement was made in 2006 and trains began to be tested during the course of late 2010 and early 2011. As of June 2013, only three to five MF 67 trains remain in service. There is also one MF 01 train for Line 9 (#096) that is in revenue service along Line 5. None of the Line 9 trains will enter revenue service on Line 9 until sometime in September 2013.

Chronology
6 June 1906: Line 5 was inaugurated with a section from Place d'Italie to the Gare d'Orléans (now known as Gare d'Austerlitz).
14 July 1906: The line was temporarily extended to Gare de Lyon.
17 December 1906: The line was extended to Lancry (now known as Jacques Bonsergent).
14 October 1907: Line 2 Sud from Étoile to Place d'Italie was incorporated to the line 5.
15 November 1907: The line was extended from Lancry to Gare du Nord.
15 November 1936: Gare du Nord station was rebuilt so that the line could be extended later.
2 September 1939: Services to Arsenal station ceased at the start of World War II and was eventually closed permanently.
12 October 1942: The Étoile–Place d'Italie portion of the line was transferred to line 6 (Place d'Italie–Nation).  Line 5 was extended from Gare du Nord to Église de Pantin.
25 April 1985: The line was extended from Église de Pantin to Bobigny–Pablo Picasso.
15 June 2011: Cascading of MF 67 to MF 01 rolling stock began.

Future
An extension south from Place d'Italie to Place de Rungis has been put forward and may be built between 2020 and 2030.
An intermediate station, Bobigny–la Folie, could be built in between Bobigny–Pablo Picasso and Bobigny–Pantin–Raymond Queneau stations. The current stretch of track between the two is one of the longest between adjacent stations on the Métro network (excluding RER lines).

Stations renamed
15 October 1907: Place Mazas renamed as Pont d'Austerlitz.
1 June 1916: Pont d'Austerlitz renamed Quai de la Rapée.
15 October 1930: Gare d'Orléans renamed Gare d'Orléans-Austerlitz.
10 February 1946: Lancry renamed Jacques Bonsergent.
1979: Gare d'Orléans-Austerlitz renamed Gare d'Austerlitz.

Tourism
Métro line 5 passes near several places of interest :
The Place d'Italie and the area of the Butte aux Cailles
The Place de la République
place de la Bastille and the Opera Bastille.
The 19th century railway stations of Gare du Nord, Gare de l'Est and Gare d'Austerlitz.
The Parc de la Villette and the Cité des Sciences et de l'Industrie.

Connections 
Other Métro lines and RER lines
Eurostar to St. Pancras Station, London

See also

References

External links

  RATP official website
  RATP english language website
  Interactive Map of the RER (from RATP's website)
  Interactive Map of the Paris métro (from RATP's website)
  Mobidf website, dedicated to the RER (unofficial)
  Metro-Pole website, dedicated to Paris public transports (unofficial)

 
Railway lines opened in 1906
1906 establishments in France